Kozhuh Peak is the ice-covered peak rising to 1711 m on the west side of Elgar Uplands, northern Alexander Island in Antarctica. It surmounts Delius Glacier to the north and Bartók Glacier to the south-southwest.

The feature is named after the extinct volcano of Mount Kozhuh, Southwestern Bulgaria.

Location

Maps
 British Antarctic Territory. Scale 1:200000 topographic map. DOS 610 – W 69 70. Tolworth, UK, 1971
 Antarctic Digital Database (ADD). Scale 1:250000 topographic map of Antarctica. Scientific Committee on Antarctic Research (SCAR). Since 1993, regularly upgraded and updated

Notes

References
 Bulgarian Antarctic Gazetteer. Antarctic Place-names Commission. (details in Bulgarian, basic data in English)
 Kozhuh Peak. SCAR Composite Gazetteer of Antarctica

External links
 Kozhuh Peak. Copernix satellite image

Mountains of Alexander Island
Bulgaria and the Antarctic